Ebenezer, less commonly spelled Ebenezar, is a male given name of Hebrew origin meaning "stone of the help" (derived from the phrase Eben ha-Ezer). The name is sometimes abbreviated as Eben.

List of people with the given name Ebenezer
 Ebenezer Aboagye (born 1994), Ghanaian footballer
 Ebenezer Ackahbi (born 2003), Ghanaian footballer
 Ebenezer Adam (1919–2011), Ghanaian teacher and politician
 Ebenezer Adams (1765–1841), American educator
 Ebenezer Kwadwo Teye Addo, Ghanaian politician
 Ebenezer Addy (born 1940), Ghanaian sociologist and former sprinter
 Ebenezer Ackon (born 1996), Ghanaian footballer
 Ebenezer Ako-Adjei (1916–2002), Ghanaian politician
 Ebenezer Ato Ayirebi-Acquah (1993–1997), Ghanaian politician
 Ebenezer Akuete (born 1935), Ghanaian diplomat and economist
 Ebenezer Akwanga (born 1970), Ambazonian independence activist
 Ebenezer Alden (1788–1881), American medical biographer and physician
 Ebenezer Allen (Vermont politician) (1743–1806), American patriot
 Ebenezer Allen (Texas politician) (1804–1863), American politician
 Eben Allen (1868–1931), Australian businessman and politician
 Ebenezer Assifuah (born 1993), Ghanaian footballer
 Ebenezer Theophilus Odartei Ayeh (born 1920), Ghanaian politician
 Ebenezer Thompson Baird (1821–1887), American minister
 Ebenezer Baldwin (1745–1776), American religious leader
 Ebenezer Bancroft (1738–1827), American soldier
 E.T. Barnette (1863–1933), American swindler
 Ebenezer Bassett (1833–1908), American ambassador
 Ebenezer Battelle (1754–1815), American politician and soldier
 Ebenezer Battle (1779), American politician
 Ebenezer Bailey (1795–1839), American educator
 Ebenezer Beesley (1840–1906), writer and composer of Mormon religious music
 Ebenezer Blakely (1806–1889), American lawyer and politician
 Ebenezer Bradbury (1793–1864), American politician
 Ebenezer N. Briggs (1801–1873), American lawyer and politician
 Ebenezer Brigham (1789–1861), American pioneer and politician
 Ebenezer Brown (1824–1883), English-Canadian merchant and politician
 Ebenezer Bryce (1830–1913), Mormon pioneer
 Ebenezer John Buchanan (1844–1930), South African journalist and politician
 Ebenezer Burgess (1790–1870), American minister
 Ebenezer Butterick (1826–1903), American tailor and inventor
 Eben Byers (1880–1932), Socialite, industrialist, athlete
 Ebenezer Calendar, (1912–1985), Sierra Leonean musician
 Ebenezer Child (1770–1886), American composer
 Ebenezer Childs (1797–1864), American pioneer and legislator
 Ebenezer Coker (died 1783), English silversmith
 Ebenezer Colls (1812–1887), English painter
 Ebenezer Cooke (disambiguation), several people
 Ebenezer Crafts (1740–1810), American businessman
 Ebenezer Cunningham (1881–1877), British mathematician
 Ebenezer Dadzie (born 1975), Ghanaian footballer
 Ebenezer Moses Debrah (born 1928), Ghanaian diplomat
 Ebenezer Denny (1761–1822), American soldier and politician
 Ebenezer Dimieari (1948–1960), Nigerian Anglican priest
 Ebenezer Doan (1772–1866), American-Canadian builder
 Ebenezer Donkor (1938–2016), Ghanaian actor
 Ebenezer P. Dorr (1817–1881), American merchant
 Ebenezer Dumont (1814–1871), American politician and general
 Ebby Edwards (1884–1961), English politician
 Ebenezer Elliott (1781–1849), English poet
 Ebenezer Erskine (1680–1754), Scottish minister
 Ebenezer Ekuban (born 1976), American football player
 Ebenezer Elmer (1752–1843), American physician and politician
 Ebenezer Emmons (1799–1863), American geologist
 Eben Etzebeth (born 1991), South African rugby player
 Ebenezer B. Finley (1833–1916), American Congressman
 Ebenezer Fitch (1756–1833), American Calvinist clergyman
 Ebenezer Fisher (1785), American politician
 Ebenezer Fontes Braga (born 1969), Brazilian mixed martial artist
 Ebb Ford (1890–1974), British marine zoologist
 Ebenezer Forrest (1774), English attorney
 Ebenezer Foster (1783), English politician
 Ebenezer Fox (died 1886), English journalist
 Ebenezer Albert Fox (1857–1926), English poacher
 Ebenezer Ghansah (born 1959), British taekwondo practitioner
 Ebenezer Goddard (1816–1882), English engineer, businessman, and politician
 Ebenezer Grant (1882–1962), English footballer
 Ebenezer O. Grosvenor (1820–1910), American politician
 Ebenezer Hagan (born 1975), Ghanaian footballer
 Eben Hayes (1798–1881), American preacher and politician
 Ebenezer Hamlin (1844–1900), New Zealander politician
 Ebenezer Hazard (1744–1817), American businessman and publisher
 Ebenezer Henderson (1784–1858), Scottish minister and missionary
 Ebenezer Henderson (writer) (1809–1879), Scottish historian and writer
 Ebenezer Herrick (1785–1839), American politician
 Ebenezer J. Hill (1845–1917), American politician
 Ebenezer R. Hoar (1816–1895), American politician and lawyer
 Ebenezer Howard (1850–1928), British urbanist
 Ebenezer Kingsbury Hunt (1810–1889), American physician
 Ebenezer Kobina Fosu (born 1952), Ghanaian politician
 Ebenezer Huntington (1754–1834), American politician and soldier
 Ebenezer Jackson Jr. (1796–1874), American politician
 Ebenezer Johnson (1786–1849), American businessman and politician
 Ebenezer Alfred Johnson (1813–1891), American classical scholar
 Ebenezer Joshua (1908–1991), Vincentian politician
 Ebenezer Jones (1820–1860), English poet
 Ebenezer Kendell (1886–1966), Australian politician
 Ebenezer Kinnersley (1711–1778), English scientist, inventor, and lecturer
 Ebenezer Knowlton (1815–1784), American politician and minister
 Ebenezer Kojo Kum (born 1967), Ghanaian politician
 Ebenezer Laing (1931–2015), Ghanaian botanist and genecist
 Ebenezer Landells (1808–1860), English wood-engraver, illustrator, and magazine proprietor
 Ebenezer Lane (1793–1866), American politician
 Ebenezer Learned (1728–1801), American soldier
 Ebenezer Lounsbery (1787–1868), American politician
 Ebenezer Mack (1791–1849), New York politician
 Ebenezer Mackintosh (1737–1816), American shoemaker and protester
 Ebenezer James MacRae (1881–1951), Scottish architect
 Ebenezer Maitland (1780–1858), English landowner and politician
 Ebenezer Magoffin (1817–1865), Confederate officer
 Ebenezer E. Mason (1829–1910), American farmer and magistrate
 Ebenezer Joseph Mather (1849–1927), English activist and writer
 Ebenezer Mattoon (1755–1843), American politician
 Ebenezer Cobb Morley (1831–1924), English sportsman
 Ebenezer Moseley (1813–1903), American-Canadian shipbuilder
 Ebby Nelson-Addy (born 1992), English footballer
 Ebenezer Norman (born 1981), Liberian philanthropist
 Ebenezer F. Norton (1774–1851), American politician
 Ebenezer Ntlali (born 1954), South African Anglican bishop
 Ebenezer Obey (born 1942), Nigerian pop musician
 Ebenezer Oduro Owusu (born 1960), Ghanaian entomologist
 Ebenezer Ofori (born 1995), Ghanaian footballer
 Ebenezer J. Ormsbee (1834–1924), American politician
 Ebenezer Parkes (1848–1919), English politician
 Ebenezer Peck (1805–1881), American attorney and politician
 Ebenezer W. Peirce (1822–1902), American soldier
 Ebenezer Pemberton (1746–1835), American educator
 Ebenezer Pemberton (minister) (1671–1717), colonial American clergyman
 Ebenezer J. Penniman (1804–1890), American politician
 Ebenezer Perry (1788–1876), Canadian merchant and politician
 Ebenezer Pettigrew (1783–1848), American politician
 Ebenezer Picken (1769–1816), Scottish poet
 Ebenezer Platt Rogers (1817–1881), American minister and author
 Ebenezer W. Poe (1846–1898), American politician
 Ebenezer Porter (1772–1834), American minister and writer
 Ebenezer Erskine Pressly (1808–1860), American theologian
 Ebenezer Prout (1835–1909), English musical theorist, writer, teacher, and composer
 Ebenezer Quartey (born 1934), Ghanaian sprinter
 Ebenezer Raynale (1804–1881), American physician and politician
 Ebenezer Rhodes (1762–1839), English topographer
 Ebenezer Russell (1747–1836), American politician
 Ebenezer Sandford (1848–1897), New Zealander politician
 Ebenezer Sage (1755–1834), American politician
 Ebenezer Seaver (1763–1844), American politician
 Ebenezer Seeley (1793–1866), American lawyer and politician
 Ebenezer Sekyere (born 1999), Ghanaian footballer
 Ebenezer Sekyi-Hughes (born 1939), Ghanaian politician
 Ebenezer Selvin  (born 2009) Musician, footballer, orator)
 Ebenezer J. Shields (1778–1846), American politician
 Ebenezer Shoobridge (1820–1901), Australian politician
 Ebenezer Sibly (1751–1799), English philosopher, astrologer, and writer
 Ebenezer Sunder Singh (born 1967), Indian-American visual artist
 Ebenezer Skellie (1842–1898), American soldier
 Ebenezer "Slick" Smith (1929–1997), American stock car racer
 Ebenezer Sproat (1752–1805), American soldier
 Ebenezer Stevens (1751–1823), American soldier and merchant
 Ebenezer Stoddard (1785–1847), American politician
 Ebenezer Syme (1825–1860), Scottish-Australian journalist
 Ebenezer Teichelmann (1859–1938), surgeon, mountaineer and photographer
 Ebenezer Okletey Terlabi] (born 1969), Ghanaian politician
 Ebenezer Thayer (1746–1809), American politician
 Ebenezer Thomas (1802–1863), Welsh teacher and poet
 Ebenezer Trotman (1809–1865), English architect
 Ebenezer Tucker (1758–1845), American politician
 Ebenezer Vickery (1827–1906), Australian businessman, pastoralist, and philanthropist
 Ebenezer Wake Cook (1843–1926), English painter
 Ebenezer Walden (1777–1857), American politician
 Ebenezer A. Warner (1858–1862), American politician
 Ebenezer Ward (1837–1917), Australian politician and journalist
 Ebenezer Washburn (1756–1826), Canadian businessman and politician
 Ebenezer Webster (1739–1808), Father of Daniel Webster
 Ebenezer T. Wells (1835–1923), American jurist
 Ebenezer Whatley (1878–1933), English-Canadian farmer and politician
 Ebenezer Wilson (1707–1710), American politician
 Ebenezer Young (1783–1851), American politician
 Ebenezer Zane (1747–1811), American pioneer

Fictional characters
 Ebenezer Scrooge, fictional character in Charles Dickens' 1843 story A Christmas Carol.
 Ebenezer Dorset, fictional character in O. Henry's 1907 story The_Ransom of Red Chief.
 Ebenezer Le Page, the chief protagonist and fictional author of The Book of Ebenezer Le Page by G. B. Edwards
 Ebenezer Blackadder, Blackadder character from Victorian England, introduced in 1988
 Ebenezer Balfour of Shaws, character in Robert Louis Stevenson's 1886 novel Kidnapped
 Ebenezer Loomer (Ebby), one of the two villains (along with his brother Jacob) in the 19th Famous Five book by Enid Blyton, Five Go to Demon's Rocks
 Ebenezer T. Squint, puppet character in Pinwheel (TV series) 
 Ebenezar McCoy, character from The Dresden Files series by Jim Butcher.
 Ebenezer, weird character in the Shamen song, Ebenezer Goode
 Ebenezer Von Clutch, character from the video game Crash Bandicoot

See also
 Eben-Ezer, a place mentioned as the site of two battles in the Books of Samuel of the Old Testament
 "Ebeneezer Goode", a song by The Shamen
 "Ebenezer Scrooge", a fictional character from Charles Dickens' 1843 novella A Christmas Carol. Scrooge is widely known in the English-speaking world as a cold-hearted miser who becomes redeemed after being visited by three ghosts on Christmas.

References

English masculine given names